Soyuz is a series of spacecraft which has been in service since the 1960s, having made more than 140 flights. It was designed for the Soviet space program by the Korolev Design Bureau (now Energia). The Soyuz succeeded the Voskhod spacecraft and was originally built as part of the Soviet crewed lunar programs. It is launched on a Soyuz rocket from the Baikonur Cosmodrome in Kazakhstan. Between the 2011 retirement of the Space Shuttle and the 2020 demo flight of SpaceX Crew Dragon, the Soyuz served as the only means to ferry crew to or from the International Space Station, for which it remains heavily used. Although China did launch crewed Shenzhou flights during this time, none of them docked with the ISS.

History 
The first Soyuz flight was uncrewed and started on 28 November 1966. The first Soyuz mission with a crew, Soyuz 1, launched on 23 April 1967 but ended with a crash due to a parachute failure, killing cosmonaut Vladimir Komarov. The following flight was uncrewed. Soyuz 3, launched on 26 October 1968, became the program's first successful crewed mission. The only other flight to suffer a fatal accident, Soyuz 11, killed its crew of three when the cabin depressurized just before reentry. These are the only humans to date who are known to have died above the Kármán line. Despite these early incidents, Soyuz is widely considered the world's safest, most cost-effective human spaceflight vehicle, established by its unparalleled length of operational history. Soyuz spacecraft were used to carry cosmonauts to and from Salyut and later Mir Soviet space stations, and are now used for transport to and from the International Space Station (ISS). At least one Soyuz spacecraft is docked to ISS at all times for use as an escape craft in the event of an emergency. The spacecraft is intended to be replaced by the six-person Orel spacecraft.

Design 

A Soyuz spacecraft consists of three parts (from front to back):
 A spheroid orbital module, which provides accommodation for the crew during their mission.
 A small aerodynamic reentry module, which returns the crew to Earth.
 A cylindrical service module with solar panels attached, which contains the instruments and engines.

The orbital and service modules are single-use and are destroyed upon reentry in the atmosphere. Though this might seem wasteful, it reduces the amount of heat shielding required for reentry, saving mass compared to designs containing all of the living space and life support in a single capsule. This allows smaller rockets to launch the spacecraft or can be used to increase the habitable space available to the crew ( in Apollo CM vs  in Soyuz) in the mass budget. The orbital and reentry portions are habitable living space, with the service module containing the fuel, main engines and instrumentation. The Soyuz is not reusable; it is expendable. A new Soyuz spacecraft must be made for every mission.

Soyuz can carry up to three crew members and provide life support for about 30 person-days. The life-support system provides a nitrogen/oxygen atmosphere at sea-level partial pressures. The atmosphere is regenerated through potassium superoxide (KO2) cylinders, which absorb most of the carbon dioxide (CO2) and water produced by the crew and regenerates the oxygen, and lithium hydroxide (LiOH) cylinders, which absorb leftover CO2.

The vehicle is protected during launch by a payload fairing, which is jettisoned along with the SAS at  minutes into launch. It has an automatic docking system. The ship can be operated automatically or by a pilot independently of ground control.

Launch escape system 
The Vostok spacecraft used an ejector seat to bail out the cosmonaut in the event of a low-altitude launch failure, as well as during reentry; however, it would probably have been ineffective in the first 20 seconds after liftoff, when the altitude would be too low for the parachute to deploy. Inspired by the Mercury LES, Soviet designers began work on a similar system in 1962. This included developing a complex sensing system to monitor various launch-vehicle parameters and trigger an abort if a booster malfunction occurred. Based on data from R-7 launches over the years, engineers developed a list of the most likely failure modes for the vehicle and could narrow down abort conditions to premature separation of a strap-on booster, low engine thrust, loss of combustion-chamber pressure, or loss of booster guidance. The spacecraft abort system (SAS) could also be manually activated from the ground, but unlike American spacecraft, there was no way for the cosmonauts to trigger it themselves.

Since it turned out to be almost impossible to separate the entire payload shroud from the Soyuz service module cleanly, the decision was made to have the shroud split between the service module and descent module during an abort. Four folding stabilizers were added to improve aerodynamic stability during ascent. Two test runs of the SAS were carried out in 1966–1967.

The basic design of the SAS has remained almost unchanged in 50 years of use, and all Soyuz launches carry it. The only modification was in 1972, when the aerodynamic fairing over the SAS motor nozzles was removed for weight-saving reasons, as the redesigned Soyuz 7K-T spacecraft carried extra life-support equipment. The uncrewed Progress resupply ferry has a dummy escape tower and removes the stabilizer fins from the payload shroud. There have been three failed launches of a crewed Soyuz vehicle: Soyuz 18a in 1975, Soyuz T-10a in 1983 and Soyuz MS-10 in October 2018. The 1975 failure was aborted after escape-tower jettison. In 1983, Soyuz T-10a's SAS successfully rescued the cosmonauts from an on-pad fire and explosion of the launch vehicle. Most recently, in 2018, the SAS sub-system in the payload shroud of Soyuz MS-10 successfully rescued the cosmonauts from a rocket failure 2 minutes and 45 seconds after liftoff, after the escape tower had already been jettisoned.

Orbital module 

The forepart of the spacecraft is the orbital module, also known as habitation section. It houses all the equipment that will not be needed for reentry, such as experiments, cameras or cargo. The module also contains a toilet, docking avionics and communications gear. On the latest Soyuz versions (since Soyuz TM), a small window was introduced, providing the crew with a forward view.

A hatch between it and the descent module can be closed so as to isolate it to act as an airlock if needed, crew members exiting through its side port (near the descent module). On the launch pad, the crew enter the spacecraft through this port. This separation also lets the orbital module be customized to the mission with less risk to the life-critical descent module. The convention of orientation in a micro-g environment differs from that of the descent module, as crew members stand or sit with their heads to the docking port. Also the rescue of the crew whilst on the launch pad or with the SAS system is complicated because of the orbital module.

Separation of the orbital module is critical for a safe landing; without separation of the orbital module, it is not possible for the crew to survive landing in the descent module. This is because the orbital module would interfere with proper deployment of the descent module's parachutes, and the extra mass exceeds the capability of the main parachute and braking engines to provide a safe soft-landing speed. In view of this, the orbital module was separated before the ignition of the return engine until the late 1980s. This guaranteed that the descent module and orbital module would be separated before the descent module was placed in a reentry trajectory. However, after the problematic landing of Soyuz TM-5 in September 1988 this procedure was changed, and the orbital module is now separated after the return maneuver. This change was made as the TM-5 crew could not deorbit for 24 hours after they jettisoned their orbital module, which contained their sanitation facilities and the docking collar needed to attach to Mir. The risk of not being able to separate the orbital module is effectively judged to be less than the risk of needing the facilities in it, including the toilet, following a failed deorbit.

Descent module 

The descent module, also known as a reentry capsule, is used for launch and the journey back to Earth. Half of the descent module is covered by a heat-resistant covering to protect it during reentry; this half faces forward during reentry. It is slowed initially by the atmosphere, then by a braking parachute, followed by the main parachute, which slows the craft for landing. At one meter above the ground, solid-fuel braking engines mounted behind the heat shield are fired to give a soft landing. One of the design requirements for the descent module was for it to have the highest possible volumetric efficiency (internal volume divided by hull area). The best shape for this is a sphere – as the pioneering Vostok spacecraft's descent module used – but such a shape can provide no lift, resulting in a purely ballistic reentry. Ballistic reentries are hard on the occupants due to high deceleration and cannot be steered beyond their initial deorbit burn. Thus it was decided to go with the "headlight" shape that the Soyuz uses – a hemispherical forward area joined by a barely angled (seven degrees) conical section to a classic spherical section heat shield. This shape allows a small amount of lift to be generated due to the unequal weight distribution. The nickname was thought up at a time when nearly every headlight was circular. The small dimensions of the descent module led to it having only two-man crews after the death of the Soyuz 11 crew. The later Soyuz-T spacecraft solved this issue.

Service module 

At the back of the vehicle is the service module. It has a pressurized container shaped like a bulging can (instrumentation compartment) that contains systems for temperature control, electric power supply, long-range radio communications, radio telemetry, and instruments for orientation and control. A non-pressurized part of the service module (propulsion compartment) contains the main engine and a liquid-fuelled propulsion system, using N2O4 and UDMH, for maneuvering in orbit and initiating the descent back to Earth. The ship also has a system of low-thrust engines for orientation, attached to the intermediate compartment. Outside the service module are the sensors for the orientation system and the solar array, which is oriented towards the Sun by rotating the ship. An incomplete separation between the service and reentry modules led to emergency situations during Soyuz 5, Soyuz TMA-10 and Soyuz TMA-11, which led to an incorrect reentry orientation (crew ingress hatch first). The failure of several explosive bolts did not cut the connection between the service and reentry modules on the latter two flights.

Reentry procedure 
The Soyuz uses a method similar to the United States Apollo command and service module to deorbit itself. The spacecraft is turned engine-forward, and the main engine is fired for deorbiting on the far side of Earth ahead of its planned landing site. This requires the least propellant for reentry; the spacecraft travels on an elliptical Hohmann transfer orbit to the entry interface point, where atmospheric drag slows it enough to fall out of orbit.

Early Soyuz spacecraft would then have the service and orbital modules detach simultaneously from the descent module. As they are connected by tubing and electrical cables to the descent module, this would aid in their separation and avoid having the descent module alter its orientation. Later Soyuz spacecraft detached the orbital module before firing the main engine, which saved propellant. Since the Soyuz TM-5 landing issue, the orbital module is once again detached only after the reentry firing, which led to (but did not cause) emergency situations of Soyuz TMA-10 and TMA-11. The orbital module cannot remain in orbit as an addition to a space station, as the airlock hatch between the orbital and reentry modules is a part of the reentry module, and the orbital module therefore depressurizes after separation.

Reentry firing is usually done on the "dawn" side of the Earth, so that the spacecraft can be seen by recovery helicopters as it descends in the evening twilight, illuminated by the Sun when it is above the shadow of the Earth. The Soyuz craft is designed to come down on land, usually somewhere in the deserts of Kazakhstan in Central Asia. This is in contrast to the early United States crewed spacecraft and the current SpaceX Crew Dragon, which splash down in the ocean.

Spacecraft systems 

 Thermal control system – 
 Life support system – 
 Power supply system – 
 Communication and tracking systems – Rassvet (Dawn) radio communications system, onboard measurement system (SBI), Kvant-V spacecraft control, Klyost-M television system, orbit radio tracking (RKO)
 Onboard complex control system – 
 Combined propulsion system – 
 Chaika-3 motion control system (SUD)
 Optical/visual devices (OVP) – VSK-4, night vision device (VNUK-K), docking light, pilot's sight (VP-1), laser rangefinder (LPR-1)
 Kurs rendezvous system
 Docking system – 
 Teleoperator control mode – 
 Entry actuators system – 
 Landing aids kit – 
 Portable survival kit – , containing a TP-82 Cosmonaut survival pistol or Makarov pistol
 Soyuz launch escape system – 

Orbital module (A)
1 docking mechanism
2, 4 Kurs rendezvous radar antenna
3 television transmission antenna
5 camera
6 hatch

Descent module (B)
7 parachute compartment
8 periscope
9 porthole
11 heat shield

Service module (C)
10, 18 attitude control engines
12 Earth sensors
13 Sun sensor
14 solar panel attachment point
15 thermal sensor
16 Kurs antenna
17 main propulsion
19 communication antenna
20 fuel tanks
21 oxygen tank

Variants 

The Soyuz spacecraft has been the subject of continuous evolution since the early 1960s. Thus several different versions, proposals and projects exist.

Specifications

Soyuz 7K (part of the 7K-9K-11K circumlunar complex) (1963) 

Sergei Korolev initially promoted the Soyuz A-B-V circumlunar complex (7K-9K-11K) concept (also known as L1) in which a two-man craft Soyuz 7K would rendezvous with other components (9K and 11K) in Earth orbit to assemble a lunar excursion vehicle, the components being delivered by the proven R-7 rocket.

First generation 

The crewed Soyuz spacecraft can be classified into design generations. Soyuz 1 through Soyuz 11 (1967–1971) were first-generation vehicles, carrying a crew of up to three without spacesuits and distinguished from those following by their bent solar panels and their use of the Igla automatic docking navigation system, which required special radar antennas. This first generation encompassed the original Soyuz 7K-OK and the Soyuz 7K-OKS for docking with the Salyut 1 space station. The probe and drogue docking system permitted internal transfer of cosmonauts from the Soyuz to the station.

The Soyuz 7K-L1 was designed to launch a crew from the Earth to circle the Moon, and was the primary hope for a Soviet circumlunar flight. It had several test flights in the Zond program from 1967–1970 (Zond 4 to Zond 8), which produced multiple failures in the 7K-L1's reentry systems. The remaining 7K-L1s were scrapped. The Soyuz 7K-L3 was designed and developed in parallel to the Soyuz 7K-L1, but was also scrapped. Soyuz 1 was plagued with technical issues, and cosmonaut Vladimir Komarov was killed when the spacecraft crashed during its return to Earth. This was the first in-flight fatality in the history of spaceflight.

The next crewed version of the Soyuz was the Soyuz 7K-OKS. It was designed for space station flights and had a docking port that allowed internal transfer between spacecraft. The Soyuz 7K-OKS had two crewed flights, both in 1971. Soyuz 11, the second flight, depressurized upon reentry, killing its three-man crew.

Second generation 

The second generation, called Soyuz Ferry or Soyuz 7K-T, comprised Soyuz 12 through Soyuz 40 (1973–1981). It did not have solar arrays. Two long, skinny antennas were put in the solar panels's place. It was developed out of the military Soyuz concepts studied in previous years and was capable of carrying 2 cosmonauts with Sokol space suits (after the Soyuz 11 accident). Several models were planned, but none actually flew in space. These versions were named Soyuz P, Soyuz PPK, Soyuz R, Soyuz 7K-VI, and Soyuz OIS (Orbital Research Station).

The Soyuz 7K-T/A9 version was used for the flights to the military Almaz space station.

Soyuz 7K-TM was the spacecraft used in the Apollo-Soyuz Test Project in 1975, which saw the first and only docking of a Soyuz spacecraft with an Apollo command and service module. It was also flown in 1976 for the Earth-science mission, Soyuz 22. Soyuz 7K-TM served as a technological bridge to the third generation.

Third generation 

The third generation Soyuz-T spacecraft (1976–1986) featured solar panels again, allowing longer missions, a revised Igla rendezvous system and new translation/attitude thruster system on the Service module. It could carry a crew of three, now wearing spacesuits.

Fourth generation

Soyuz-TM (1986–2002) 

The Soyuz-TM crew transports were fourth generation Soyuz spacecraft, and were used from 1986 to 2002 for ferry flights to Mir and the International Space Station (ISS).

Soyuz-TMA (2003–2012) 

Soyuz TMA features several changes to accommodate requirements requested by NASA in order to service the International Space Station (ISS), including more latitude in the height and weight of the crew and improved parachute systems. It is also the first expendable vehicle to feature a digital control technology. Soyuz-TMA looks identical to a Soyuz-TM spacecraft on the outside, but interior differences allow it to accommodate taller occupants with new adjustable crew couches.

Soyuz TMA-M (2010–2016) 

The Soyuz TMA-M was an upgrade of the baseline Soyuz-TMA, using a new computer, digital interior displays, updated docking equipment, and the vehicle's total mass was reduced by 70 kilograms. The new version debuted on 7 October 2010 with the launch of Soyuz TMA-01M, carrying the ISS Expedition 25 crew.

The Soyuz TMA-08M mission set a new record for the fastest crewed docking with a space station. The mission used a new six-hour rendezvous, faster than the previous Soyuz launches, which had, since 1986, taken two days.

Soyuz MS (since 2016) 

Soyuz MS is the final planned upgrade of the Soyuz spacecraft. Its maiden flight was in July 2016 with mission Soyuz MS-01.

Major changes include:
 more efficient solar panels
 modified docking and attitude control engine positions for redundancy during docking and de-orbit burns
 new Kurs NA approach and docking system which weighs half as much and consumes a third of the power of previous system
 new TsVM-101 computer, about one eighth the weight (8.3 kg versus 70 kg) and much smaller than the previous Argon-16 computer
 unified digital command/telemetry system (MBITS) to relay telemetry via satellite, and control spacecraft when out of sight of ground stations; also provides the crew with position data when out of ground tracking range
 GLONASS/GPS and Cospas-Sarsat satellite systems for more accurate location during search/rescue operations after landing

Related craft 
The uncrewed Progress spacecraft are derived from Soyuz and are used for servicing space stations.

While not being direct derivatives of Soyuz, the Chinese Shenzhou spacecraft uses Soyuz TM technology sold in 1984 and the Indian Orbital Vehicle follows the same general layout as that pioneered by Soyuz.

Image gallery

See also 

 Crew Space Transportation System (CSTS), study to develop a European-Russian successor to Soyuz. Was cancelled.
 Orel, a Russian replacement for the Soyuz, first crewed flight scheduled for 2025. Influenced by CSTS.
 Dragon 2 American commercial human spaceflight system
 List of Soviet human spaceflight missions
 List of Russian human spaceflight missions
 Orbital Technologies Commercial Space Station
 Sokol space suit
 Space Shuttle orbiter, American re-usable spacecraft from 1981 to 2011
 Voskhod Spacecraft "Globus" IMP navigation instrument
 Zarya (spacecraft)
 List of Soyuz missions

References

External links 

 News page  from the Energia (corporation) which launches the Soyuz spacecraft
 Soyuz at the Encyclopedia Astronautica
 Soyuz TMA spacecraft details at nasa.gov
 Mir Hardware Heritage
  
 
 Journey to ISS by the European Space Agency (ESA), a series of videos about Soyuz launch, docking and reentry
 

1967 in spaceflight
Vehicles introduced in 1967
Supply vehicles for the International Space Station
Crewed spacecraft
Soyuz program
Articles containing video clips